Herbert Ernest Pott (15 January 1883 – 9 May 1953) was a British diver who competed in the 1908 Summer Olympics and in the 1912 Summer Olympics. He was born in Richmond, London.

In 1908 he was eliminated in the semi-finals of the 3 metre springboard competition after finishing third in his heat. Four years later he finished sixth in the 3 metre springboard event.

References

External links

1883 births
1953 deaths
British male divers
Olympic divers of Great Britain
Divers at the 1908 Summer Olympics
Divers at the 1912 Summer Olympics